Azabiri Ayamga (born 1933) is a Ghanaian politician and member of the first parliament of the second republic of Ghana representing Bongo constituency in the Upper Region of Ghana under the membership of the Progess Party (PP).

Early life and education 
Azabiri was born  in 1933. He attended Government Teacher Training College Tamale (G.T.T.C. - Tamale), Kwame Nkrumah Ideological Institute, Winneba where he obtained a Teachers' Training Certificate and later worked as a Teacher before going into Parliament.

Politics 
He began his political career in 1969 as a parliamentary candidate for the constituency of Bongo in the Upper Region of Ghana prior to the commencement of the 1969 Ghanaian parliamentary election.

He was sworn into the First Parliament of the Second Republic of Ghana on 1 October 1969, after being pronounced winner at the 1969 Ghanaian election held on 26 August 1969. His tenure of office ended on 13 January 1972.

Personal life 
He is a Christian.

References 

Ghanaian MPs 1969–1972
1933 births
Ghanaian Christians
Ghanaian educators
Progress Party (Ghana) politicians
Living people